Gong Guiping (born 1 February 1969) is a Chinese cross-country skier. She competed in four events at the 1992 Winter Olympics.

References

External links
 

1969 births
Living people
Chinese female cross-country skiers
Olympic cross-country skiers of China
Cross-country skiers at the 1992 Winter Olympics
Place of birth missing (living people)